The Botswana national football team represents Botswana in international football under the control of the Botswana Football Association. Following the independence of Botswana in 1966, the football federation was founded in 1970. It later joined joined the Confederation of African Football (CAF) in 1976 and FIFA in 1982.

The following list contains all results of Botswana's official matches between the year 2000 and 2019.

Key

Official Results

2000

2001

2002

2003

2004

2005

2006

2007

2008

2009

2010

2011

2012

2013

2014

2015

2016

2017

2018

2019

References

Notes

External links 
RSSSF List of Matches
ELO List of Matches
National Football Teams List of Matches
Soccerway List of Matches
FIFA List of Matches

See also 
Botswana national football team results (1968 to 1999)
Botswana national football team results (2020 to present)

Botswana national football team